The Islamic Azad University, West Tehran Branch (WTIAU) is a private university in Shahrak-e Gharb, Tehran, Iran. Founded in 1994 on western part of Tehran City. It offers more than 103 undergraduate and graduate degree programs in a wide range of disciplines. As of now, it is considered to be the one of leading branches in the country and has 14 approved doctoral courses, 45 master's courses, 38 continuous bachelor's courses, and 6 non-continuous bachelor's courses, and it is proud to have introduced 20070 graduates to the job market. It is one of the few remaining IAU branches that takes The Iranian University Entrance Exam known as Konkour for admission that takes place every year in June.

History
The Islamic Azad University, West Tehran Branch, started its activity on February 1, 1994, under the title of Sama Technical and Higher Education Institute affiliated to the Islamic Azad University by recruiting full-time students in the field of computer application in the non-continuous associate degree and in 1999 with an increase in the recruiting number of students in associate and bachelor's programs, the name was changed to Tehran branch of Sama. In 2003, Tehran Sama Technical and Vocational School for Girls and in 2004, Tehran Sama Technical and Vocational School for Boys were launched as a subset of this academic unit with the capacity to recruit students in the non-continuous associate degree. In 2006, the Tehran branch of Sama was separated from the organization of Sama and continued its activities as one of the Islamic Azad University units, and in 2007 it was officially renamed as the Islamic Azad University, West Tehran Branch. At the beginning of the activities of the West Tehran unit, some Humanities and engineering fields were added to the number of fields of the West Tehran unit, and after that, during the years 2008-2011, while completing the fields of engineering, management and Humanities, the process of recruiting experienced academic staff and upgrading the scientific pyramid of this academic unit was done. In the history of Islamic Azad University, West Tehran Branch, the year 2014 can be introduced as a turning point in the formation, expansion and promotion of this university. In this year, while expanding the educational space, the Faculty of Art and Architecture and subsequently the Faculty of Management were established, and in addition to the expansion of the undergraduate courses of these faculties, in the postgraduate level, 18 doctoral courses and 71 master's courses were started to attract students. It was done so that at the end of 2014, the number of students of this university increased to more than 10,000 people. The years 2015-2018 can be considered as the years of expanding the educational space, reforming and developing the administrative structure and supplementing the human resources, laboratory and workshop equipment and information technology infrastructures, expanding the field of graduate studies, setting up research and development centers, Establishing relations and cooperation with industrial centers and research institutes, so that the Islamic Azad University, West Tehran Branch is a leading branch of Islamic Azad University not only in Tehran province but also in the country with nearly 16,000 students in bachelor's, master's and doctoral degrees in the field Technical and engineering, management, art and architecture and social sciences, 191 faculty members, more than 40 laboratories and workshops, two research centers and a growth center are introduced. Attracting elite students in graduate studies, completing the academic staff pyramid by recruiting experienced, young and elite professors, developing educational space and laboratories and workshops, upgrading and updating information technology infrastructure, paying attention to the quality of educational and research affairs, developing communication with industrial and research centers, strengthening of entrepreneurship, establishment and support of start-up companies and encouragement and persuasion of professors and students in this direction, the roadmap and doctrine of this university unit is considered to achieve the defined goals and the promotion and development of higher education of the Iranian homeland.

Faculties
Islamic Azad University, West Tehran Branch has 5 major faculties: 

1 - Engineering 

This faculty has 7 undergraduate majors, 25 master's majors, and 4 doctoral majors.

The Faculty of Engineering has more than 7,000 students studying and is equipped with laboratories and workshops for civil engineering, industries, electricity and electronics, and intends to develop the laboratories and workshops in terms of quality. In addition, a well-equipped and large library with about 20,000 volumes of books on various subjects helps students and professors in research. This faculty currently has 67 faculty members in five groups and is determined to increase the number of faculty members not only in the direction of excellence and growth of the goals of higher education in terms of attracting students in graduate studies, but also by increasing the quality level of education. Be diligent in making education fruitful in different disciplines.

It should be mentioned that the educational space of the engineering faculty has thirty-two well-equipped classrooms, two drawing studios, two educational sites, a public site, a library, a study hall, educational and research workshops and laboratories, a seminar room and an amphitheater hall. Also, the educational groups are engaged in the activity of six scientific associations in the faculty, and all the activities of these associations are carried out by the students of the relevant groups.

2 - Management and Economics 

The Faculty of Management and Economics was previously operating in the Faculty of Humanities, which was approved by the central organization and is being implemented. In the first semester of 2016 - 2017, in the building that previously belonged to the Faculty of Electricity, Computer and Environment, it started its activities independently. This faculty has about 3000 students in the fields of management and environment. 

3. Humanities and Social Sciences 

The Faculty of Humanities and Social Sciences, West Tehran Branch, in the doctoral level, has the field of English language teaching and sociology, with a focus on economic sociology and development, and in the master's level, it has the fields of English language teaching, accounting, international law, private law, clinical psychology, general psychology, social communication science, Cultural affairs, cultural affairs, counseling and guidance, cultural and media studies, family counseling and social sciences, sociology and revolutionary sociology, and at the undergraduate level, there are accounting majors, accounting, auditing, tax, government and law, psychology, economics, sports sciences and It is counseling. The number of faculty members is 37, and a total of 3263 students are studying in the college. It is necessary to mention that the hotel management workshop classes of the West Tehran branch are located in this faculty and the classes of the students of this field are held in the workshop.

In order to deal with qualitative development according to necessity at this stage, the efforts of the faculty and faculty members will be focused on improving the quality of educational groups. In addition, in order to strengthen the field of research, the creation of a psychology laboratory and the establishment of scientific associations in the existing fields have been on the agenda. The Counseling Center of West Tehran Unit is also active due to the availability of psychology and counseling courses in this faculty with the aim of helping dear students. 

4 - Civil Engineering, Art and Architecture

This faculty has started its activity independently since the first semester of the academic year 2016-2017, and 2300 civil engineering, art and architecture students are studying at the undergraduate, graduate and doctoral levels in civil engineering, architecture, industrial design and urban planning.

This faculty with the number of 18 faculty members and about 120 guest lecturers moves to advance the scientific and artistic goals of the academic society of Iran. Also, this faculty has two scientific associations (architecture - industrial design) and an official art department, which work to advance the scientific goals of the university.

5 - Basic and General Sciences (Sadra Department)

The Complex of Basic and General Sciences of the Islamic Azad University, West Tehran branch started its activity from the beginning of the first semester of 2016-2017, and the basic and general department (including mathematics, physics, general foreign language and Persian literature departments) of all faculties including Engineering - Civil Engineering, Art and architecture - Accounting and Management were transferred to this center. In addition to the above-mentioned general courses, a class on the basics of homeland defense, as well as Physics Laboratory (1) and (2) are also held in this complex.

See also
 Colleges and universities
 Higher Education in Iran
 List of universities in Iran - including list of IAU Universities
 Islamic Azad University Science and Research Branch
 Islamic Azad University Central Tehran Branch
 Islamic Azad University South Tehran Branch
 Islamic Azad University North Tehran Branch

References

External links
 Official website

Educational institutions established in 1994
West Tehran
1994 establishments in Iran
Engineering universities and colleges in Iran
Universities in Tehran